Tullaroan is a Gaelic Athletic Association club located in the village of Tullaroan in County Kilkenny, Ireland.  The club was founded in 1884 and is primarily concerned with the game of hurling.  Tullaroan is the most successful club in the history of the Kilkenny Senior Hurling Championship.

History

Tullaroan is the oldest GAA club in County Kilkenny. The club was founded in 1884, the same year as the foundation of the Gaelic Athletic Association. Tullaroan currently lead the roll of honour in Kilkenny with twenty senior county championship titles.

Honours

Kilkenny Senior Hurling Championships: - 20
 1887, 1889, 1895, 1897, 1899, 1901, 1902, 1904, 1907, 1910, 1911, 1915, 1924, 1925, 1930, 1933, 1934, 1948, 1958, 1994
 Beaten Finalists - 11
 1905, 1906, 1913, 1916, 1936, 1947, 1949, 1951, 1952, 1954, 1992
 Kilkenny Intermediate Hurling Championships: 2
 1988, 2019
 All-Ireland Intermediate Club Hurling Championships: 1
 2020
 Leinster Intermediate Club Hurling Championship 1
 2019
 Kilkenny Junior Hurling Championships: 1
 1983
 Kilkenny Minor Hurling Championships: 1
 1999
 Kilkenny Under-21 Hurling Championships: 1
 2001
 All Ireland Under-14A Feile Winners: 1
 1997

Notable hurlers

This is a list of notable hurlers who have played for Tullaroan.  Generally, this means players that have enjoyed much success with the club or have played for the Kilkenny senior hurling team.

  Seán Clohessy
 Jimmy Coogan
 Jim Dermody
 Jer Doheny
 Shem Downey played senior inter-county team from 1946 until 1954. Shem's daughters, Angela and  Ann won 12 All-Ireland camogie medals each and 13 club titles between them. Angela is commonly recognised as the greatest players the game has seen.
 Dock Grace
 Pierce Grace
 Jack Hoyne
 Dan Kennedy
 Jack Keoghan
 Jim Lawlor
 Pat Maher
 Lory Meagher
 Jimmy Phelan
 Paddy Phelan
 Jack Rochford
 Paddy Saunders
 Pádraig Walsh
 Tommy Walsh - Born 1983 and won 9 all-stars in a row
 Tommy Walsh - Born 1998 and a current member of the Kilkenny hurling panel
 Sim Walton
 Martin White

See also
 Kilkenny Senior Hurling Championship

References

Hurling clubs in County Kilkenny
Gaelic games clubs in County Kilkenny
1884 establishments in Ireland